Triplophysa kashmirensis is a species of stone loach in the genus Triplophysa found in India and Pakistan.

References

kashmirensis
Taxa named by Sunder Lal Hora
Fish described in 1922